Dolný Moštenec is a town section of Považská Bystrica District in the Trenčín Region of north-western Slovakia.

History
In historical records the village was first mentioned in 1397.

Geography
The municipality lies at an altitude of 344 meters and covers an area of 5.74 km². It has a population of about 741 people.

References

External links

 Dolný Moštenec on Google Maps

Parts of the Považská Bystrica city